The 1927 Hessian state election was held on 13 November 1927 to elect the 70 members of the Landtag of Hesse.

Results

References 

Hesse
Elections in Hesse